Sri Purandara Dasaru is a 1967 Indian Kannada-language film, directed by C. V. Raju and produced by Smt Jayalakshmi. The film stars K. S. Ashwath, R. Nagendra Rao, Udaykumar and Rajashankar. The film has musical score by C. N. Pandurangan. This was the third Kannada movie on the life of Purandara Dasa after the 1937 movie Purandaradasa and the 1964 movie Navakoti Narayana.

Cast 

K. S. Ashwath
R. Nagendra Rao
Udaykumar
Rajashankar
Balakrishna
Narasimharaju
Venkatesh
Raghavendra Rao
Vadiraj
Rathnakar
Ganapathi Bhat
Master Sridhar
Chittibabu
Ramachandra Shastry
Dwarakish
Bangalore Nagesh
Rajendra Krishna
Kuppuraj
Srikanth
Niranjan
Lakshmaiah
Dinesh
Shivaram
Dattharaj
Iyengar
Bapayya
Swamy
Pandari Bai
Harini
Mynavathi
L. Vijayalakshmi
Ramadevi
Papamma
Saroja
Janaki
Shanthamma
Kutty Padmini

Soundtrack 
The music was composed by C. N. Pandurangan.

Reception 
The Indian Express wrote, "If for nothing else, the music would make the Kannada film [Sri Purandara Dasaru] worth the while."

References 

1967 films
1960s Kannada-language films
Films scored by C. N. Pandurangan